Mireille d'Ornano (born 29 June 1951) is a French politician who is a member of The Patriots. Between 2014 and 2020, she was a National Front Member of the European Parliament representing South-East France.

References

1951 births
Living people
MEPs for South-East France 2014–2019
21st-century women MEPs for France
National Rally (France) MEPs
People from Angoulême
Politicians from Auvergne-Rhône-Alpes